Kevin Boehm is an American restaurateur who is the co-founder of Boka Restaurant Group and the Independent Restaurant Coalition. With his business partner, Rob Katz, he operates 22 restaurants in Chicago, Los Angeles, and New York City. Kevin, along with his business partner, won the James Beard Award for Outstanding Restaurateur in America in 2018.

Early life and education 
Boehm was raised in Springfield, Illinois. He attended the University of Illinois.

Career  
In 1993 Boehm opened his first restaurant on money he had saved as a server and bartender. He opened restaurants in Seaside, Florida, Springfield, Illinois, and Nashville Tennessee before founding Boka Restaurant Group with Rob Katz in 2002. 
Boehm has been featured as a judge on two episodes of Top Chef and one episode of Top Chef Canada. 

As a writer, Boehm has had pieces published in Esquire Magazine, McSweeney’s, Plate Magazine, and the Chicago Sun Times. He is also a contributing writer for Fast Company. 

During the 2020 coronavirus pandemic, he co-founded and was involved in leading the Independent Restaurant Coalition, an industry group founded during the pandemic to lobby the federal government for relief for restaurants and their employees, which culminated in $28.6 Billion in grants being given out by the federal government.

Honors  
In 2018 Boehm won the James Beard Award for Outstanding Restaurateur, after being a finalist in 2015, 2016, and 2017. Boka Restaurant has been awarded one Michelin star for nine consecutive years.

Personal life  
Boehm is married to Cortney Moon and has three children.

See also 

 James Beard Award
 Top Chef: All-Stars L.A.
 Michelin Stars
 Food & Wines

References 

Living people
1970 births
American restaurateurs
American founders
People from Springfield, Illinois